Francisco Calderón Guardia (13 June 1906 – 17 July 1977) was a Costa Rican politician.

Guardia was a member of the influential Calderón-Guardia family, born in San Jose, the son of Rafael Ángel Calderón Muñoz and Ana Maria Guardia Mora.  He was married three times, first in 1937 with Leticia G.H.G. Bernini, second with Josefina Gonzalez and third in 1965 with Maria Luisa Lopez Mejia.

During the presidential administration of his brother Rafael Ángel Calderón Guardia, Francisco Calderón Guardia was Secretary of the Interior (1940-1942) and Minister of Public Security (1942-1944). From 1940 until 1944, Guardia was third Vice President of Costa Rica. During which time he served for five days (1 to 5 December 1941) as the interim President, while his brother was on a trip to Nicaragua.  He was first Vice President of Costa Rica in the following administration of Teodoro Picado Michalski, 1944-1948.

After the civil war of 1948, Guardia and his brothers fled to Nicaragua. Later he moved to Mexico, from whence he returned to Costa Rica in 1958. He was again a member of the Costa Rican government as a deputy from 1958 to 1962 in the administration of Mario Echandi Jiménez. In 1966, he joined with his brother, Rafael Ángel, in forming the National Unification Party, and after his brother's death in 1970, Guardia became the most prominent figure in the party.

Francisco Calderón Guardia died in San Jose, Costa Rica, on 17 July 1977.

Notes

External links
 Picture of Francisco Calderón Guardia from Life Magazine in 1955, accessed 30 November 2008

Vice presidents of Costa Rica
1906 births
1977 deaths
Government ministers of Costa Rica
National Unification Party (Costa Rica) politicians